The Lavo Kingdom was a political entity (mandala) on the left bank of the Chao Phraya River in the Upper Chao Phraya valley from the end of Dvaravati civilization, in the 7th century, until 1388. The original center of Lavo civilization was Lavo (modern Lopburi), but the capital shifted southward   to Ayodhaya, the port city on the right side of the Ayutthaya island around the 11th century, whereupon the state was incorporated into the Ayutthaya Kingdom in the 14th century.

History

Background

Dvaravati and Mon domination

The area of Dvaravati (what is now Thailand) was first inhabited by Mon people who had arrived and appeared centuries earlier. The foundations of Buddhism in central Southeast Asia were laid between the 6th and 9th centuries when a Theravada Buddhist culture linked to the Mon people developed in central and northeastern Thailand. Theravadin Buddhists believe that Enlightenment can be obtained only by one living the life of a monk (and not by a layman). Unlike Mahayana Buddhists, who admit the texts of numerous Buddhas and Bodhisattvas into canon, Theravadans venerate only the Buddha Gautama, the founder of the religion. The Mon Buddhist kingdoms that rose in what are now parts of Laos and Central Plain of Thailand were collectively called Dvaravati.

The Mon of Lavo

According to the Northern Thai Chronicles, Lavo was founded by Phraya Kalavarnadishraj, who came from Takkasila in 648 CE. According to Thai records, Phraya Kakabatr from Takkasila (it is assumed that the city was Tak or Nakhon Chai Si) set the new era, Chula Sakarat in 638 CE, which was the era used by the Siamese and the Burmese until the 19th century. His son, Phraya Kalavarnadishraj founded the city a decade later.

King Kalavarnadishraj used the name "Lavo" as the name of the kingdom, which came from the Hindu name "Lavapura", meaning "city of Lava", in reference to the ancient South Asian city of Lavapuri (present-day Lahore).

The only native language found during early Lavo times is the Mon language. However, there is debate whether Mon was the sole ethnicity of Lavo. Some historians point out that Lavo was composed of mixed Mon and Lawa people (a Palaungic-speaking people), with the Mons forming the ruling class. It is also hypothesized that the migration of Tai peoples into Chao Phraya valley occurred during the time of the Lavo kingdom.

Theravada Buddhism remained a major belief in Lavo although Hinduism and Mahayana Buddhism from the Khmer Empire wielded considerable influence. Around the late 7th century, Lavo expanded to the north. In the Northern Thai Chronicles, including the Cāmadevivaṃsa, Camadevi, the first ruler of the Mon kingdom of Hariphunchai, was said to be a daughter of a Lavo king.

Few records are found concerning the nature of the Lavo kingdom. Most of what we know about Lavo is from archaeological evidence. Tang dynasty chronicles record that the Lavo kingdom sent tributes to Tang as Tou-ho-lo. In his diary, the monk Xuanzang referred to Dvaravati-Lavo as Tou-lo-po-ti, which seems to echo the name Dvaravati, as a state between Chenla and the Pagan Kingdom. By the Song dynasty, Lavo was known as Luówō.

Khmer cultural vassalization

Isanavarman I of the Chenla Kingdom expanded Khmer influence to the Chao Phraya valley through his campaigns around the 7th century. Dvaravati cities that fell under Khmer hegemony became Lavo, while the Western cities were spared from Khmer hegemony and formed Suvarnabhumi. Lavo was the center from which Khmer authority ruled over the Dvaravati.

Around the 10th century, the city-states of Dvaravati merged into two mandalas – the Lavo (modern Lopburi) and Suvarnabhumi (modern Suphan Buri). According to a legend in the Northern Chronicles, in 903, a king of Tambralinga invaded and took Lavo and installed a Malay prince to the Lavo throne. The Malay prince was married to a Khmer princess who had fled an Angkorian dynastic bloodbath. The son of the couple contested for the Khmer throne and became Suryavarman I, thus bringing Lavo under Khmer domination through personal union. Suryavarman I also expanded into Isan, constructing many temples.

Arrival of Tai

Modern Thai historians think the Tai peoples originated in northern Vietnam and Guangxi province in China. The origin of the Tai peoples were living in northern Southeast Asia by the 8th century.   Five linguistic groups emerged: the northern Tai in China (ancestors of Zhuang); the upland Tai people in northern Vietnam (ancestors of the Black, White and Red Tai); the Tais in northeastern Laos and bordering Vietnam (ancestors of the Tai of Siang Khwang and the Siamese in Ayutthaya); the Tai in northern Laos; and the Tai west of Luang Prabang, northern Thailand and in the adjoining parts of Laos, Yunnan and Burma. The Tai people had emigrated in the area what is now Thailand around 11th century, the land was already inhabited by Mon and Khmer speaking peoples, who had arrived earlier.

Tai Villages and Mueang

Tai peoples lived in the lowland and river valleys of mainland Southeast Asia. Assorted ethnic and linguistic group lived in the hills. The Tai village consisted of nuclear families working as subsistence rice farmers, living in small houses elevated above the ground. Households bonded together for protection from external attacks and to share the burden of communal repairs and maintenance. Within the village, a council of elders was created to help settle problems, organise festivals and rites and manage the village. Village would combine to form a Mueang, a group of villages governed by a Chao (lord). When Tai people settled in Central Plain of Thailand, the Cambodian ruler named them as Siem in Khmer language. The Tai lords adopted both Mon alphabet and Khmer alphabet, which the Tai developed into their own writing systems as Tai Tham alphabet, for the Thai Yuan people in the north, and Khom-Thai alphabet, for the Siamese Tai in the lower region. The Siamese also called themselves as Tai or Thai and called Lavo as "Lopburi" in Tai dialect language.

Settled in the rural fringes of the Khmer Empire and in upper Laos, the Tai peoples, united by their lords, were becoming a formidable threat to the Khmer Empire. Despite intermarriage between the Tai and the Khmer ruling families, the Tai people kept their distinct cultural and ethnic identity, retaining their own languages and units of social organisation.

Emergence of Tai city states

Siamese Lavo (11th century)
The formidable political control exercised by the Angkor Empire extended not only over the centre of the Khmer province, where the majority of the population was Khmer, but also to outer border provinces likely populated by non-Khmer peoples—including areas to the north and northeast of modern Bangkok, the lower central plain and the upper Ping River in the Lamphun-Chiang Mai region.

The Tai people were the predominant non-Khmer groups in the areas of central Thailand that formed the geographical periphery of the Khmer Empire. Tai groups were probably assimilated into Khmer population. Historical records show that they maintained their cultural distinctiveness, although their animist religion partially gave way to Buddhism. Tai historical documents note that the period of the Angkor Empire was one of great internal strife. During the 11th and 12th centuries, territories with a strong Tai presence, such as Lavo or Lopburi (in what is now north-central Thailand), resisted Khmer control.

In the 11th century, Lavo was governed by a Cambodian prince, as a part of vassal state of the Khmer Empire of Angkor, However, Lavo wanted liberation and sought acknowledgement from China (Song dynasty) in 1001 and 1155 as an independent state. Lavo's large Tai population and its roots in the Dvaravati did not assimilate well with the Khmer civilisation, and in Khmer writings Lopburi was considered a province of Angkor that had a Syamese (Siamese) identity.

The Khmer influences on Lavo began to wane as a result of the growing influence of the emerging Burmese kingdom of Pagan. In 1087, Kyansittha of Pagan invaded Lavo, but King Narai of Lavo was able to repel the Burmese invasion and Lavo, emerging relatively stronger from the encounter, was thus spared from either Khmer or Burmese hegemony. King Narai moved the capital to Ayodhaya and Lavo was then able to exert pressure on Suvarnabhumi to the west and slowly to take its cities.

Yet another wave of Khmer invasions arrived under Jayavarman VII. This time, Lavo was assimilated into the religious cosmos of the Khmer Empire – Hinduism and Mahayana Buddhism. Khmer influence was great on Lavo arts and architecture as seen in the Prang Sam Yot.

In 1239, the Tai governor of Sukhothai rebelled and declared independence from Lavo – giving birth to the Sukhothai Kingdom. In Northern Thai chronicles Lavo is called “Khom”, and during the 13th century the Lavo kingdom shrank swiftly due to the expansion of Sukhothai under Ram Khamhaeng the Great, retreating to its heartland around Lavo and Ayodhaya.

The Kingdom of Lavo, Lo-hu, sent embassies to China between 1289 and 1299. in 1349 Hsien people of Sukhothai become united with the people of Lo-hu, the new kingdom named Hsien Lo by the chinese.

Merger with Ayutthaya kingdom
In 1350, Uthong, who had been a post-Angkorian ruler of one of the cities in Lower Chao Phraya Valley and Borommarachathirat I of Suvarnabhumi (modern Suphan Buri) co-founded a Ayutthaya city, an island on intersection of three rivers; Chao Phraya River, Lopburi River and Pa Sak River, and Uthong became the king of the city. But Borommarachathirat I took Ayutthaya from Uthong's son Ramesuan in 1370 and then Ramesuan retreated back to Lavo. In 1388 Ramesuan took revenge by taking Ayutthaya back from Borommarachathirat I's son, Thonglan. Borommarachathirat I's nephew Intharacha took Ayutthaya back for Suphannaphum dynasty in 1408. Uthong dynasty was then purged and became a mere noble family of Ayutthaya until the 16th century.

Thare are many theories about Uthong's origin, according to HRH Prince Chula Chakrabongse, he was thought to have been a descendant of Mangrai. Van Vliet's chronicles, a seventeenth-century work, stated that King Uthong was a Chinese merchant who established himself at Phetchaburi before moving to Ayutthaya. Tamnan Mulla Satsana, a sixteenth-century Lanna literature, stated that King Uthong was from Lavo Kingdom.

After the foundation of the Ayutthaya Kingdom in the 14th century, Lavo was incorporated into a major stronghold of Ayutthaya Kingdom. It became the capital of the kingdom during the reign of King Narai in the mid-17th century and the king resided there about eight months a year.

See also
Locach 
History of Lopburi

References

Former countries in Thai history
Mon people
Former countries in Southeast Asia
Former monarchies of Asia
Lopburi province
Indianized kingdoms
450 establishments
States and territories disestablished in 1388
1380s disestablishments in Asia
5th-century establishments in Thailand
14th-century disestablishments in Thailand
1st millennium in Thailand
2nd millennium in Thailand
Ancient Thailand
History of Lopburi
History of Central Region (Thailand)
Former monarchies of Southeast Asia